Zygmunt Gloger (3 November 1845 in Tybory-Kamianka – 16 August 1910 in Warsaw) was a Polish historian, archaeologist, geographer and ethnographer, bearer of the Wilczekosy coat of arms. Gloger founded the precursor of modern and widely popular Polish Tourist and Sightseeing Society (PTTK).

Life
Under the professional influence of historians and geographers Julian Bartoszewicz as well as Józef Ignacy Krasicki, and later Wincenty Pol and Oskar Kolberg, Gloger voyaged through Poland and Lithuania under the foreign Partitions, and corresponded with many European scholars.

Founder of Towarzystwo Krajoznawcze (the Sightseeing Society, precursor of modern PTTK), in his will Gloger gave his impressive collection to that organization as well as to the Towarzystwo Ethnograficzne (the Ethnographic Society), Towarzystwo Bibliotek Publicznych w Warszawie (Public Libraries Society) and Museum of Industry and Agriculture.

His life's work was the Encyklopedia staropolska ilustrowana (1900-1903), still considered a useful and important book about culture of Polish–Lithuanian Commonwealth. His other works include  Obchody weselne (1869), Pieśni ludu (1892), Księga rzeczy polskich (1896), Rok polski w życiu, tradycji i pieśni (1900).

Works
  
 "Encyklopedia staropolska", Zygmunt Gloger, 1900-1903, online
 "Dolinami rzek. Opisy podróży wzdłuż Niemna, Wisły, Bugu i Biebrzy" Zygmunt Gloger, 1903, online

See also
List of Poles

References

Further reading
 Józefowicz, Anna. 2019. “Zygmunt Gloger’s "Baśnie I powieści" ("Fairy Tales and Stories") – Composition, Characters, Axiology”. In: Bibliotekarz Podlaski 43 (2), 389-410. https://doi.org/10.36770/bp.27.

1845 births
1910 deaths
People from Wysokie Mazowieckie County
Polish nobility
19th-century Polish historians
Polish male non-fiction writers
Burials at Powązki Cemetery